Chembong is a state constituency in Negeri Sembilan, Malaysia, that has been represented in the Negeri Sembilan State Legislative Assembly.

The state constituency was first contested in 1986 and is mandated to return a single Assemblyman to the Negeri Sembilan State Legislative Assembly under the first-past-the-post voting system. , the State Assemblyman for Chembong is Zaifulbahri Idris from the Barisan Nasional (BN).

Definition 
The Chembong constituency contains the polling districts of Ulu Pedas, Sepri, Kampong Rendah, Kampong Senama Ulu, Chembong, Pekan Pedas, Kampong Pedas Tengah, Pekan Rembau, Batu Hampar, Mampong, Pilin and Kundor.

Representation history

Election results
The electoral results for the Chembong state constituency in 2008, 2013 and 2018 are as follows.

References

Negeri Sembilan state constituencies